Since its formation in 1959, the Swiss Research Centre for Rationalization in Building and Civil Engineering or CRB (the abbreviation stems from the original French name "Centre Suisse d’études pour la Rationalisation du Bâtiment", now "Centre suisse d'études pour la rationalisation de la construction") has worked to improve communication within the Swiss construction sector. In close collaboration with the professional and trade associations, CRB acts on behalf of the Swiss construction industry in developing standard tools for use across the entire life cycle of buildings – from design and construction to facility management. Adopting a uniform system structure and terminology, these tools facilitate the collaboration between clients, designers, contractors and suppliers, and provide the foundation for digitization in construction.

History and organization 

Organized in the legal form of an "association" (under the Swiss Civil Code), CRB has some 5,000 members throughout Switzerland. It was formed in 1959 by the Federation of Swiss Architects (FSA). Other supporting bodies now include the Swiss Society of Engineers and Architects (SIA) and the Swiss Contractors' Association (SBV). Today, all the Swiss construction industry's key associations and organizations are represented on the Board and support CRB's operations. CRB now has around 70 employees, who work at its offices in Zurich, Fribourg and Bellinzona. Moreover, each year, up to 400 construction professionals and practitioners are mandated to carry out work for CRB.

National and international networking 

CRB collaborates closely with numerous construction-sector associations and organizations within Switzerland. To ensure that users can reap the full benefits of standardization and rationalization, now and in the future, subjects such as building information modelling (BIM) and digitization figure prominently in CRB's development work. CRB is a member of the following organizations:
 
•	netzwerk_digital: CRB's remit within this association, which supports and promotes the co-ordinated development of digitization in Switzerland, is standardization. Other members include SIA, the Co-ordination Conference for Federal Construction and Real Estate Authorities (KBOB) representing public-sector clients, the Private Professional Owners Interest Group (IPB) and "Bauen digital Schweiz" (Swiss Digital Construction).
 
•	buildingSMART International

•	International Construction Information Society (ICIS)

Core business 

CRB's best-known tools are the Catalogue of Standard Descriptions (NPK) construction specification system, the Building Cost Classification (BCC) and two further, element-based cost classifications (eBKP-H and eBKP-T), all of which are available in German, French and Italian. CRB also has the exclusive rights in Switzerland for distribution of the Swedish-developed Natural Colour System (NCS). NCS is the only colour system to describe colours in the same way as they are perceived by the human eye. 
The Catalogue of Standard Descriptions specification system now comprises over one million brand- and product-neutral work items from the fields of building construction, civil engineering (incl. tunnelling) and building services. It allows the systematic preparation of consistent, detailed and clearly worded specifications for construction works. It is cross-linked to the cost planning and monitoring tools, and forms the basis for digital data exchange. The prd.crb.ch construction product platform provides construction professionals and practitioners with valuable product and manufacturer information. 
The production- or trade-oriented Building Cost Classification (BCC) is used by designers, contractors, clients and investors as a common basis for the uniform presentation of cost information. CRB has also produced two element-based cost classifications, the eBKP-H (for building construction) and eBKP-T (for civil engineering). These boost efficiency in cost planning by helping to identify those building elements with the highest costs and greatest optimization potential.

External links 

•	CRB website

Organizations established in 1959
Organisations based in Switzerland
1959 establishments in Switzerland